Diane Virjee née Mahy (born 20 January 1960 in Victoria, British Columbia) is a Canadian former field hockey player who competed in the 1984 Summer Olympics.

References

External links
 

1960 births
Living people
Field hockey players from Victoria, British Columbia
Canadian female field hockey players
Olympic field hockey players of Canada
Field hockey players at the 1984 Summer Olympics